Chambi National Park (sometimes Chambi Mountain National Park or Djebel Chambi National Park) is a national park in Tunisia's Kasserine Governorate. It protects the flora and fauna surrounding Mount Chambi (Djebel Chambi), the highest mountain peak (1,544m above sea level) in Tunisia.

The park is part of the Mont de Tebessa forest massif which spans the area from Kasserine to the Algerian border. The parks has no permanent rivers or streams, but it is one of the last refuges of the endangered Cuvier's gazelle and home to vulnerable Barbary sheep. The park is also the site of notable plant life (holm oak and Cotoneaster nummularia, Aleppo pine, and Stipa tenacissima) and birds (including the Tunisian crossbill, the Egyptian vulture, Bonelli's eagle, and the peregrine falcon, among others).

In 1970, a  fenced reserve was established to protect Cuvier's gazelle. In 1977, the park and its surrounding areas were designated a UNESCO biosphere reserve. The  park was established as a national park in 1980.

References

National parks of Tunisia
Protected areas established in 1980
Kasserine Governorate
Biosphere reserves of Tunisia